Bonkuy-e Ashayir Owlad Sani (also Romanized as Bonkūy-e ‘Ashāyīr Owlād S̄ānī) is a village in Miyan Deh Rural District, Shibkaveh District, Fasa County, Fars Province, Iran. At the 2006 census, its population was 108, in 26 families.

References 

Populated places in Fasa County